Bulatovci (Cyrillic: Булатовци) is a village in the municipalities of Osmaci (Republika Srpska) and Kalesija, Bosnia and Herzegovina.

Demographics 
According to the 2013 census, its population was 302, with none of them living in the Osmaci part thus all in the Kalesija part.

References

Populated places in Kalesija
Populated places in Osmaci